Federal Highway 41 (Carretera Federal 41) (Fed. 41) is a free (libre) part of the federal highways corridors (los corredores carreteros federales)of Mexico. The highway travels east-northeast for  before heading mostly south for  toward Cuerámaro.

References

041